Fulcinia is a genus of praying mantises found in Australia. It is the type genus of the subfamily Fulciniinae and tribe Fulciniini.

Species
The Mantodea Species File lists the following species:
 Fulcinia alaris Saussure, 1871 - type species
 Fulcinia exilis Giglio-Tos, 1915
 Fulcinia lobata Werner, 1928
 Fulcinia punctipes Werner, 1928
 Fulcinia uxor Werner, 1928
 Fulcinia variipennis Westwood, 1889

References

External links 

Mantodea genera
Nanomantidae